The Journal of Infection is a monthly peer-reviewed medical journal in the field of infectious disease, covering microbiology, epidemiology and clinical practice. Established in 1979, the journal was initially published quarterly by Academic Press. The first editor was Hillas Smith. The Journal of Infection is the official publication of the British Infection Association (formerly the British Infection Society and the British Society for the Study of Infection). Since 2006, the editor-in-chief has been Robert C. Read (University of Southampton, UK) and the publisher is Elsevier.

Abstracting and indexing
The journal is abstracted and indexed in:

According to the Journal Citation Reports, Journal of Infection has a 2021 impact factor of 38,637, ranking it 4th out of 94 in the category Infectious Diseases.

References

Further reading

External links
 
 British Infection Association

Microbiology journals
Elsevier academic journals
Publications established in 1979
Monthly journals
English-language journals